Shri Chhatrapati Shahu Maharaj Terminus Kolhapur - Hazrat Nizamuddin Superfast Express is a Superfast express train of the Indian Railways connecting Shri Chhatrapati Shahu Maharaj Terminus in Maharashtra and  Hazrat Nizamuddin in Delhi. It is currently being operated with 12147/12148 train numbers on once in week basis.

Route and halts 

The important halts of the train are :

Traction

As the route is yet to be fully electrified, it is hauled by a Pune Diesel Loco Shed  based WDP4D or WDM3A/3D from Kolhapur up to Pune handing over to a Bhusaval Electric Loco Shed  based WAP-4 locomotive for the remainder of the journey until Hazrat Nizamuddin.

Direction Reversal

Train Reverses its direction 1 time

Rake Maintenance 

The train is maintained by the Kolhapur Coaching Depot. The same rake is used for Ahmedabad Junction - Shri Chhatrapati Shahu Maharaj Terminus Kolhapur Express for one way which is altered by the second rake on the other way.

See also 

 Shri Chhatrapati Shahu Maharaj Terminus railway station
 Hazrat Nizamuddin railway station
 Ahmedabad Junction - Shri Chhatrapati Shahu Maharaj Terminus Kolhapur Express

References 
12147/SCSMT Kolhapur - Hazrat Nizamuddin SF Express)
12148/Hazrat Nizamuddin - SCSMT Kolhapur SF Express

Rail transport in Maharashtra
Rail transport in Madhya Pradesh
Rail transport in Uttar Pradesh
Rail transport in Delhi
Transport in Delhi
Express trains in India
Transport in Kolhapur